Benincaseae is one of 15  tribes in the family Cucurbitaceae.

Subtribes and genera
Benincaseae consists of at least one subtribe, 26 genera, and over 200 species.
Benincasinae
Acanthosicyos
Benincasa
Citrullus
Coccinia
Diplocyclos
Lagenaria
Lemurosicyos
Praecitrullus
Raphidiocystis
Ruthalicia
Other:
Blastania
Borneosicyos
Cephalopentandra
Ctenolepis
Cucumis
Dactyliandra
Indomelothria
Khmeriosicyos
Melothria
Muellerargia
Papuasicyos
Peponium
Scopellaria
Solena
Trochomeria
Zehneria

References

Rosid tribes
Cucurbitoideae
Taxa named by Nicolas Charles Seringe